USC&GS Carlile P. Patterson was a survey ship of the United States Coast and Geodetic Survey in operation between 1883 and 1918. Subsequently, she had a brief period of naval service and fifteen seasons as a merchant vessel before she was wrecked on the Alaska coast in 1938.

Construction

Carlile P. Patterson was named for Carlile Pollock Patterson, fourth Superintendent of the Coast Survey and first of the Coast and Geodetic Survey. The New York Times credited the design to Commander Colby Mitchell Chester, USN, at that time Hydrographic Inspector in USC&GS. Naval architect Samuel Hartt Pook, U.S. Naval Constructor, was credited with supervising the drawings. She was built of wood in James D. Leary's yard at Williamsburg (Brooklyn) New York. Frames were white oak with cedar tops; planking, beams and lower deck were yellow pine, the upper deck was white pine. Her hull was fitted with iron diagonal braces, and five watertight bulkheads (three wood, two iron). Power was a cross compound vertical steam engine (one source reports , another source says ; this difference may represent different calculation or measurement methods) and she could carry 133 tons of coal as fuel. Her machinery was constructed by Neafie & Levy of Philadelphia. She was rigged as a barkentine with double topsail yards; standing rigging was galvanized charcoal-iron wire. Her boats were two steam launches, two cutters, two whaleboats, and a dinghy. Her deckhouse, included the engine and boiler rooms, galley, pantry, and a drafting room. She carried a Sigsbee piano-wire sounding machine, state-of-the-art for deep-water hydrography, holding five miles of wire. Lieutenant Richardson Clover, USN, supervised construction and became her first commander.

Federal career

Carlile P. Patterson departed Hampton Roads for the west coast on July 30, 1884. She traveled by way of the Straits of Magellan, with stops at Madeira, Rio de Janeiro, Montevideo, Punta Arenas, Valparaíso, Callao, Panama, San Diego, and Santa Barbara. She arrived at San Francisco February 13, 1885, and immediately began preparations for her first season of surveying. She left for Sitka April 26 and began survey work May 27.

Carlile P. Patterson was primarily used as a survey vessel off the coast of Alaska and numerous Alaskan features were named by the assorted crews of the steamer. She also served in other west-coast locations and in the Hawaiian Islands. On November 2, 1899 she was damaged when hit by the ferry  while at anchor, receiving $1,200 in damage. In 1914, she found and rescued 26 members of the crew of  after that ship struck an uncharted reef in the Aleutians and sank.

In 1918, Carlile P. Patterson was transferred to the United States Navy for use as a patrol ship during the last months of World War I. She was renamed Forward on August 15, 1918, and performed both patrol and hydrographic duties in Alaska and off the Mexican coast. Subsequently, she was returned to the Coast and Geodetic Survey in 1919. The Survey judged she was no longer strong enough for offshore use, and too slow for cost-effective hydrographic work, so she was sold. She was out of service several years.

Merchant career
In 1924, the Washington Tug and Barge Co. sold Carlile P. Patterson to C.K. West Co. of Portland Oregon who converted her to a motorship for operation along the Oregon coast; the steam engine was replaced with a diesel, probably the four-cylinder Bolinder engine she had in 1930. It was probably at this time or a year later that she underwent a substantial rebuilding. Her deckhouse, bowsprit and eventually also her mizzenmast were removed, her bow was reshaped, and the fore and main masts were replaced with, or reduced to, pole masts. A stern deckhouse and superstructure were constructed. These changes are evident in the photos of the 1938 shipwreck (this article and external links) and in a 1930 photo taken at Herschel Island.

In 1925, Patterson was purchased by the Northern Whaling and Trading Company. From then through 1936 she operated as an Arctic trading ship under Captain Christian Theodore Pedersen, operating between San Francisco and Herschel Island with stops along the Alaska coast. Subsequently, she was sold to the Alaska Patterson Co. which operated her for freight service.

Shipwreck

She was en route from Kodiak to Seattle when she went aground. The first mate was washed overboard and lost trying to launch a lifeboat and a crewman drowned in the swollen creek while attempting to rig a lifeline to get the crew to shore. The 18 survivors remained in the vessel until the tide went out, then reached the beach where they subsisted on supplies dropped from airplanes. Two men were flown out by Alaska pilot Sheldon Simmons who made a daring float plane landing in the creek. The remaining men hiked out to Lituya Bay with a guide, Nels Ludwinson, left by Simmons's plane. Ludwinson was a local trapper who had been jailed for drunkenness and let out early for the job. These man were picked up by Navy planes and the Coast Guard cutter .

Most of the cargo was salvaged by barge the next spring. Patterson was reportedly beaten to pieces by the surf.

References

External links
 Video documentary about Simmons includes 1938 rescue, Patterson photos
 Photo of Patterson aground 1938—close view from beach
 The Life and Times of a Mariner. Theodore Pedersen's photo archives. Frame of Reference (Newsletter of the Alaska Humanities Forum) v9 (1), April 1998. pp. 10–13. p. 11 has a photograph of the Patterson undergoing modification in a shipyard.
 Patterson in ice 1926. Glenbow Archive  Searches expired; site still good.
 Patterson at Oakland, almost ready to sail with schooners loaded on deck. Glenbow Archive  Searches expired; site still good.
  Summary of service record and 19 photographs

1883 ships
1938 in Alaska
Maritime incidents in 1938
Barquentines
Ships built in Brooklyn
Ships of the United States Coast and Geodetic Survey
Shipwrecks of the Alaska coast
Survey ships of the United States
World War I patrol vessels of the United States
History of the Inuvialuit Settlement Region